Esholt railway station was a railway station on the  to  line of the Midland Railway. It opened on 4 December 1876 along with Baildon station when the line was formally opened, and closed on 28 October 1940. The buildings remained after closure before being demolished in 1953.

The station was listed for closure because it was losing £100 per year. A Bradford-based insurance broker, Mr Ben Ivinson, pulled the communication cord on a steam train from Bradford to Ilkley to try to get the train to halt in the station area. Mr Ivinson was protesting about the station's closure and the railway's response of there being a good enough bus service.

References

Disused railway stations in Bradford
Former Midland Railway stations
Railway stations in Great Britain opened in 1876
Railway stations in Great Britain closed in 1940
1876 establishments in England
1940 disestablishments in England